The Longman Baronetcy, of Lavershot Hall in the Parish of Windlesham in the County of Surrey, was a title created on 23 July 1909 for Hubert Longman, a partner in Longmans, Green & Co, publishers, and a justice of the peace and county councillor for Surrey. The title became extinct on his death in 1940.

Longman baronets, of Lavershot Hall (1909)
Sir Hubert Harry Longman, 1st Baronet (1856–1940), died without heir.

Notes

Extinct baronetcies in the Baronetage of the United Kingdom